St. Michael's Mission is an Episcopal church mission established about 1887 in Fremont County, Wyoming to minister to the Arapaho and Shoshone of the Wind River Indian Reservation. It was founded by Reverend John Roberts with the permission of Shoshone Chief Washakie. The community of Ethete grew around the mission, given its name by Washakie's assent in the Shoshone language, ethete ("good" or "OK"). In 1910 the mission received an endowment from Mrs. Baird Cooper and the new site was developed over the next seven years. In 1920 the original church was moved to the mission, enlarged, and named "The Church of Our Father's House.

The buildings are arranged around an oval at the center of Ethete. The log church is accompanied by several frame buildings including a former schoolhouse, residences and a cultural center. The mission was placed on the National Register of Historic Places on June 21, 1971.

References

External links
 St. Michael's Mission at the Wyoming State Historic Preservation Office

National Register of Historic Places in Fremont County, Wyoming
Buildings and structures completed in 1910
Native American Christianity
Historic districts on the National Register of Historic Places in Wyoming
Wind River Indian Reservation